The 2022 AFF U-16 Championship was the fifteenth edition of the AFF U-16 Youth Championship, the annual international youth association football championship organised by the ASEAN Football Federation for men's under-16 national teams of Southeast Asia. It was hosted by Indonesia from 31 July to 12 August 2022. Twelve member associations of the ASEAN Football Federation competed in the tournament featuring three groups of four teams. The planned 2020 and 2021 AFF U-16 Youth Championship were cancelled due to COVID-19 pandemic in Southeast Asia.

Indonesia beat Vietnam 1–0 in the final for their second title in the championship.

Qualified teams 
There was no qualification, and all entrants advanced to the final tournament. The following 12 teams from member associations of the ASEAN Football Federation entered the tournament.

Venues
On 15 July 2022, the Football Association of Indonesia (PSSI) officially announced the 2 venues for the tournament which was located in the Special Region of Yogyakarta.

Draw 

(H): Tournament host

Group stage
 All times listed are WIB (UTC+7).

Group A

Group B

Group C

Ranking of runner-up teams 
The best runner-up team from three groups advanced to the Knockout stage.

Knockout stage 
In the knockout stage, the penalty shoot-out was used to decide the winner if necessary.

Bracket

Semi-finals

Third place match

Final

Winner

Awards

Goalscorers

Final ranking
This table will show the ranking of teams throughout the tournament.

References

External links 

2022 in AFF football
2022 in youth association football
International association football competitions hosted by Indonesia
2022 in Asian football
AFF U-16 Youth Championship
AFF
AFF
AFF